In mathematics, the rearrangement inequality states that

for every choice of real numbers

and every permutation

of 
If the numbers are different, meaning that

then the lower bound is attained only for the permutation which reverses the order, that is,  for all  and the upper bound is attained only for the identity, that is,  for all 

Note that the rearrangement inequality makes no assumptions on the signs of the real numbers.

Applications

Many important inequalities can be proved by the rearrangement inequality, such as the arithmetic mean – geometric mean inequality, the Cauchy–Schwarz inequality, and Chebyshev's sum inequality.

One particular consequence is that if  then (by using ):  holds for every permutation  of

Intuition

The rearrangement inequality is actually very intuitive. Imagine there is a heap of $10 bills, a heap of $20 bills and one more heap of $100 bills. You are allowed to take 7 bills from a heap of your choice and then the heap disappears. In the second round you are allowed to take 5 bills from another heap and the heap disappears. In the last round you may take 3 bills from the last heap. In what order do you want to choose the heaps to maximize your profit? Obviously, the best you can do is to gain  dollars. This is exactly what rearrangement inequality says for sequences  and  It is also an application of a greedy algorithm.

Proof

The lower bound follows by applying the upper bound to

Therefore, it suffices to prove the upper bound. Since there are only finitely many permutations, there exists at least one for which

is maximal. In case there are several permutations with this property, let σ denote one with the highest number of fixed points.

We will now prove by contradiction, that σ has to be the identity (then we are done). Assume that σ is  the identity. Then there exists a j in {1, ..., n − 1} such that σ(j) ≠ j and σ(i) = i for all i in {1, ..., j − 1}. Hence σ(j) > j and there exists a k in {j + 1, ..., n} with σ(k) = j. Now

 
Therefore,

Expanding this product and rearranging gives

hence the permutation

which arises from σ by exchanging the values σ(j) and σ(k), has at least one additional fixed point compared to σ, namely at j, and also attains the maximum. This contradicts the choice of σ.

If

then we have strict inequalities at (1), (2), and (3), hence the maximum can only be attained by the identity, any other permutation σ cannot be optimal.

Proof by induction
Observe first that 

implies 

hence the result is true if n = 2. 
Assume it is true at rank n-1, and let 

Choose a permutation σ for which the arrangement gives rise a maximal result.

If σ(n) were different from n, say σ(n) = k, 
there would exist j < n such that σ(j) = n. 
But  

by what has just been proved.
Consequently, it would follow that the permutation τ coinciding with σ, except at j and n, where 
τ(j) = k and τ(n) = n, gives rise a better result. This contradicts the choice of σ.
Hence σ(n) = n, and from the induction hypothesis, σ(i) = i for every i < n.

The same proof holds if one replace strict inequalities by non strict ones.

Generalizations
A straightforward generalization takes into account more sequences. Assume we have ordered sequences of positive real numbers

Then it holds

Note that unlike the common rearrangement inequality this statement requires the numbers to be nonnegative. A similar statement is true for any number of sequences with all numbers nonnegative.

Another generalization of the rearrangement inequality states that for all real numbers  and any choice of functions  such that the derivatives  satisfy:

the inequality

holds for every permutation  of

See also
 Hardy–Littlewood inequality
 Chebyshev's sum inequality

References

 
Inequalities
Articles containing proofs